Juanín may refer to:

Juanín (footballer, born 1900) (1900–?), full name Juan Bilbao Mintegi, Spanish footballer
Juanín (footballer, born 1925), full name Juan Cortiñas Méndez, Spanish footballer
Juanín (footballer, born 1937), full name Juan Antonio Rodríguez Duflox, Spanish footballer
Juanín (footballer, born 1940) (1940–2013), full name Juan García Díaz, Spanish footballer
Juanín (footballer, born 1958), full name Juan Antonio López Moreno, Spanish footballer
Juanin Clay (1949–1995), American actress
Juanín García (born 1977), Spanish handball player
Juanín Juan Harry, character from 31 minutos